Robert Rowan (born 14 September 1947) is a former Australian cricketer. He played eleven first-class cricket matches for Victoria between 1969 and 1973.

Rowan took the first wicket in List A cricket in Australia, in the opening men's match of the Vehicle & General Australasian Knock-out Competition between Tasmania and Victoria at the MCG in November 1969. The batsman was Baden Sharman, caught behind by Norman Carlyon.

See also
 List of Victoria first-class cricketers

References

External links
 

1947 births
Living people
Australian cricketers
Victoria cricketers
Cricketers from Melbourne